Haji Muhammad Saifullah or Saifullah Khan, was a lawyer, businessman and an ex-Minister for Religious Affairs and Zakat-O-Ushr of National assembly from 1987–1988 under the Zia Administration of Pakistan. He is from Allah Abad, District Rahim Yar Khan.

He served as a leader of opposition under Zia Ul Haq rule from 23 March 1985 to 19 March 1987.

Early life and education
Saifullah  was born in 1930 before the independence in a noble family. He was the eldest son in Atta-Ullah family. He completed his school and went for higher studies to HILLCREST HIGH SCHOOL. He is a registered advocate of Liaquatpur Bar Council and District Bar as well. He died on May 31, 2014, in Rahim Yar Khan, Pakistan.

References

External links
 Third Federal Cabinet Under Muhammad Khan Jonejo

1943 births
Living people
Pakistani politicians